Richard Durlacher (born 6 June 1932) is an Austrian racing cyclist. He rode in the 1959 Tour de France.

References

1932 births
Living people
Austrian male cyclists
Place of birth missing (living people)